"Detour Ahead" is a jazz standard with words and music credited to Herb Ellis, Johnny Frigo, and Lou Carter.

The song was written in 1948 while Carter, Ellis and Frigo were part of The Soft Winds, a group they created after leaving Jimmy Dorsey's orchestra. The lyrics compare love's progress to a motor trip.

Credit for music and lyrics is to Carter, Frigo, and Ellis, based on their mutual agreement when the Soft Winds trio was formed that the three would share credit for any music composed by any of them during the existence of the band. Later in life, Frigo would state at public performances that he had written by himself the music and lyrics for "Detour Ahead".

References

See also
List of 1940s jazz standards

1948 songs
1940s jazz standards